At present there is no official flag for the state of Tamil Nadu in India. A flag was proposed for the state in 1970 but was not formally adopted at that time.

1970 flag proposal

The Government of Tamil Nadu proposed a design for a state flag in 1970. The proposed design was grey with the flag of India in the canton and the Emblem of Tamil Nadu in the fly. It was proposed by newly elected Chief Minister M. Karunanidhi of the Dravida Munnetra Kazhagam party. At the time the proposal was opposed by the Chief Ministers of several other states and it was not officially adopted.

Government banner

The Government of Tamil Nadu can be represented by an image of the emblem of the state placed onto a white background. The emblem consists of the National Emblem of India flanked on either side by an Indian flag. Behind the national emblem, is the image of a Gopuram tower based on the West Tower of “Srivilliputur Temple Gopuram”.

See also
 List of Tamil Nadu state symbols
Emblem of Tamil Nadu
Tamil Thai Valthu
Tamil flags
National flag of India
List of Indian state flags

References